Eric Stubbs (12 September 1912 – 2012) was an English professional football who played as a winger. He played in the English football league for Bolton Wanderers, Wrexham, Nottingham Forest, Leicester City and Chester City.

His final pre-war club was Leicester City, for which he made his highest number of appearances, helping guide them to the First Division. After the war, he returned to his hometown Chester where he joined Chester City.

He was the first, and as of 2018 only, Leicester City player to live to the age of 100.

References

1912 births
2012 deaths
English footballers
Association football wingers
Winsford United F.C. players
Nantwich Town F.C. players
Bolton Wanderers F.C. players
Wrexham A.F.C. players
Nottingham Forest F.C. players
Leicester City F.C. players
Chester City F.C. players
English Football League players